Michael John Davis (18 August 1943 – 13 October 2000) was an English cricketer. Davis was a right-handed batsman who bowled right-arm fast-medium. He was born at Bolton, Lancashire.

Davis made his debut for Cheshire in the 1961 Minor Counties Championship against Staffordshire. He made eight further appearances for the county in that season.  He played Second XI cricket for Northamptonshire in 1962, while the following season he made his only first-class appearance for the county against Oxford University.  He wasn't required to bat in this match, but did take the wickets of Rhodri Thomas and Maurice Manasseh.  Leaving Northamptonshire in 1964, Davis played two Minor Counties Championship matches in 1965, one in 1968 and two in 1969.

He died at the Macclesfield, Cheshire on 13 October 2000 aged 57.

References

External links
John Davis at ESPNcricinfo
John Davis at CricketArchive

1943 births
2000 deaths
Cricketers from Bolton
English cricketers
Cheshire cricketers
Northamptonshire cricketers